Isanthrene perbosci is a moth of the subfamily Arctiinae. It was described by Félix Édouard Guérin-Méneville in 1844. It is found in Mexico and Guatemala.

References

 

Euchromiina
Moths described in 1844